{{safesubst:#invoke:RfD|||month = March
|day = 14
|year = 2023
|time = 23:07
|timestamp = 20230314230755

|content=
REDIRECT Eucharist in the Catholic Church

}}